Sedgwick is an 'L' station on the CTA's Brown Line, Purple Line Express trains also stop at the station during weekday rush hours. It is an elevated station with two side platforms, located in Chicago's Old Town neighborhood of the Near North Side community area.

History
The station was put into service in 1900 as part of Northwestern Elevated Railroad's initial route, and it is one of the oldest standing stations on the 'L'. 

In 1979, a portion of The Hunter starring Steve McQueen was shot at Sedgwick as part of an action scene.

During 2007, the main station entrance was closed for extensive renovation and rebuilding as part of the CTA's Brown Line capacity expansion project. Throughout the renovation period, the station remained open on weekdays but experienced several weekend closures, with entrance to the station through a temporary entrance (which was later converted to an emergency exit) located one block west of the original entrance at Hudson Avenue. 

As the outside express tracks had not been in service since 1963 they were removed and island platforms widened, converting them to side platforms. The platforms were also extended to allow eight-car trains to berth, and elevators were added along with other upgrades to meet ADA requirements. The historical station house was restored, and an extension was added behind it.

Bus connections
CTA
  N9 Ashland Night Bus (Owl Service) 
  37 Sedgwick (Weekdays Only) 
  72 North

References

External links

 https://www.transitchicago.com/assets/1/6/browntt_sedgwick.pdf at CTA official site
Sedgewick Street entrance (during reconstruction) from Google Maps Street View

CTA Brown Line stations
CTA Purple Line stations
Railway stations in the United States opened in 1900